The P 4 class torpedo boat (TB), Soviet designation Project 123-bis and Project 123-K, were Soviet aluminum-hulled torpedo boats. They were armed with either two twin  machine guns or a twin  machine gun, and two  torpedoes. A large number of them were exported to allied states such as North Vietnam and China. They saw service in a variety of conflicts including World War 2, the First Taiwan Strait Crisis, the Vietnam War and the Turkish Invasion of Cyprus.

The P 4 torpedo boats consisted of two primary types; the Project 123-bis (B-123) type with  machine guns, and the Project 123-K (K-123) type with added radar and 14.5 mm machine guns.

Design and development
The P 4 torpedo boats were developed from the pre-war prototype Komsomolets torpedo boat (Project 123) in 1942 due to the unsatisfactory performance of the G-5 type motor torpedo boat. The Project 123 was a single-step, hydroplaning design built from duralumin like the G-5. The prototype was built at the No.194 Marti yard in Leningrad in 1939, and after good test performance it was originally meant to replace it before the German invasion. Compared to the prototype Komsomolets, the new design, called Project 123-bis, had a flush deck hull, and were powered by American-supplied Packard petrol engines instead of the Soviet Mikulin GAM-34.

The armament consisted of two twin  DShK heavy machine guns, two 450 mm torpedo tubes, and 6 depth charges.

Post-war, the Project 123-bis was identified as one of the more successful Soviet torpedo boat designs and production continued. As American-supplied engines dried up, new boats were built using Soviet M-50 diesel engines. A new variant, Project 123-K, was developed in 1950, with the addition of a radar and a single twin 14.5 mm KPV machine gun replacing the DShKs.

Service history
The first P 4 torpedo boats were delivered to the Soviet Baltic Fleet in 1944. On 11 April 1945, the boats TK-131 and TK-141 attacked and scored a torpedo hit against the German destroyer Z34, though they were unable to sink it.

In 1951, the People's Republic of China purchased 46 P 4 torpedo boats from the Soviet Union, assigning them into 4 torpedo boat brigades. About 81-90 in total would be purchased from the Soviet Union from 1950-1955. The People's Liberation Army Navy would use them extensively in naval battles with the Republic of China Navy, most notably in 1954 when 4 P 4 torpedo boats sank the Evarts-class frigate Tai Ping (ex-USS Decker) off the Dachen Islands. All Chinese P 4 torpedo boats have been decommissioned, and 4 were transferred to the Bangladesh Navy in 1983.

Some of the surviving Chinese units were converted into target drones, and thus returned to service, functioning as minor support auxiliaries controlled by converted gunboats.

12 P 4 torpedo boats would be exported to North Vietnam in 1961. Three of them (T-333, T-336, and T-339) launched an abortive attack on the American Allen M. Sumner-class destroyer  in August 2, 1964, starting the Gulf of Tonkin incident (see Edwin E. Moise, Gulf of Tonkin and the Escalation of the Vietnam War (Revised Edition), Naval Institute Press, 2019, pages 52-63).

The vessels T-1 and T-3 of the Cyprus Navy were dispatched to engage the first Turkish flotilla at Operation Atilla as it approached Kyrenia. One vessel was destroyed by air attack, and the other by artillery from Turkish destroyers.

Variants
Project 123-bis: also known as B-123, original P 4 class torpedo boat design with two twin  DShK heavy machine guns and Packard petrol engines.
Project M123-bis: B-123 with Soviet M-50 diesel engines.
Project 123-K: also known as K-123, P 4 class torpedo boat with  KPV heavy machine guns and radar, slightly larger than B-123.
Project K123-K: K-123 boats fitted with a A-10bis forward hydrofoil.
Project 123-U: K-123 boats converted to target ships with remote control systems.
 2 B-123 boats were fitted with the A-10 and A-11 forward hydrofoil.
 6 K-123 boats were converted to gunboats, with their torpedoes removed and a second pair of KPV machine guns added.

Egyptian variants
Project 123-K with Rocket Launcher: K-123 boat with an eight barrel rocket launcher fitted. One example was captured by Israel.

Surviving boats 
 36 in Baltiysk, Kaliningrad Oblast
 60 in Komsomolets Torpedo Boat Memorial, St. Petersburg
 119 in Phoenix Mountain Camp, Tianjin. 
 123 in Kaliningrad Oblast
 131 in Victory Museum, Moscow
 158 "Meritorious Torpedo Boat" in the Military Museum of the Chinese People's Revolution, Beijing.
 341 in Pamyatnik Geroicheskim Moryakam Chernomortsam, Novorossiysk
 K-12 in Ha'apala and Israeli Navy Museum, Haifa
 T-8224 in Bangladesh Military Museum, Dhaka
 Unidentified in Kaliningrad
 Unidentified in Diorama, Sevastopol
 Unidentified in Katernikov Square, Kronstadt

References
Notes

Bibliography

Torpedo boat classes
Torpedo boats of the Soviet Navy
Torpedo boats of the People's Liberation Army Navy